A table of the members of the Delaware State Senate.

State Senate under the Delaware Constitution of 1776

There were three senators elected at-large from each county for a one-year term.  Elections were held in October.

State Senate under the Delaware Constitution of 1792

There were three senators elected at-large from each County for a one-year term.  Elections were held in November.

References

Martin, Roger A. (1995). Memoirs of the Senate.

State Senators
Delaware state senators
Delaware